Luca Zanotti (born 29 April 1994) is an Italian football player.

Club career
He made his Serie C debut for Virtus Entella on 11 May 2014 in a game against Perugia.

On 7 July 2019, he signed with Como. On 31 January 2023, Zanotti's contract with Como was terminated by mutual consent.

References

External links
 

1994 births
People from Trescore Balneario
Sportspeople from the Province of Bergamo
Living people
Italian footballers
Virtus Entella players
Carrarese Calcio players
A.S. Melfi players
Aurora Pro Patria 1919 players
Como 1907 players
S.S. Juve Stabia players
Serie C players
Association football goalkeepers
Footballers from Lombardy